{{Infobox person
| name               = Sheikh Hassan Dahir AweisŞeyh Hasan Tahir Aveisالشيخ حسن ضاهر عويسሼክ ሀሰን ዳሂር አዌስ
| image              =
| imagesize          = 
| caption            = Aweys during press release
| birth_date         = 
| birth_place        = Dhusa Mareb, Italian Somalia
| occupation         = Founder of Al-shabaab, ICU and Hizbul Islam
| years_active       = 1990—2013
| organization       =  Al-itihad —1991Al-qa'eda —1996ICU (Mahakim) —2000Al-shabaab —2006Hizbul al-Islam —2009
| nationality        = Somali
| opponents          = 
| criminal_status    = TerrorismAl-Qa'edaRadicalFundamentalAl-shabaab
| children           = 11
| title              = Former leader of Hizbul Islam, founder of major terrorism groups'
}}

Sheikh Hassan Dahir Aweys (English:  ((born 1935) is a Somali political figure from the Habargidir/Ayr subclan within the Hawiye clan. During the regime of Siad Barre, Aweys was a colonel in the Somali National Army (SNA) during the 1977 Ogaden War against Ethiopia. He was decorated for bravery for his part in 1977 the war. At an early stage in the fighting, Sheikh Aweys captured Abdullahi Yusuf and put him in jail. Sheikh Aweys later became a leader of Al-Itihaad al-Islamiya, which was destroyed in the late 1990s by a force led by Abdullahi Yusuf and funded by Ethiopia.

1994–2002: Al-Itihaad al-Islamiya (AIAI)

Sheikh Aweys was part of the al-Itihaad al-Islamiya leadership which took over large parts of Somalia immediately following the collapse of the Somali Central Government. From 1991 to 1998, AIAI's Gedo Region branch led by former Somali High Court Judge Mohamed Haji Yusuf maintained formidable forces. Gedo district seats of Lugh, Balad Hawo and Burdubo were all run by IAIA forces. Lugh was entirely governed by AIAI. At the time, there were other regional military authority Somali National Front (SNF) running parts of Gedo. Sheikh Aweys settled in Lower Shabelle when some disputes came of light in Lugh's Al-Itahad leadership.

On 18 September 1996, the Ethiopian army invaded Lugh and forced out most of the AIAI forces. The following two years, the war front changed into what was later to become the Mountains War of Gedo. And the war this time was between SNF and AIAI. The Ethiopian regime just armed SNF militias. Ethiopians gave SNF an estimated 800 to 1000 small arms and around a dozen heavy weapons. The Gedo war ended when both sides agreed on a truce, and general peace with a peace conference held in El Ade in December 1998 was concluded.

Terrorism accusations by U.S. President Bush

On 7 November 2001, Sheikh Aweys was named a 'supporter of terrorism' in a supplement of Executive Order 13224 of United States President George W. Bush.  According to NBC News, Sheikh Aweys is also on the terrorist list of the United States Department of State as somebody who is known as an al-Qaeda operative or who is connected with al-Qaeda.

Sheikh Aweys has always denied the US terrorism allegations. He told AFP news agency;
It is not proper to put somebody on a list of terrorists who has not killed or harmed anybody. I am not a terrorist. But if strictly following my religion and love for Islam makes me a terrorist, then I will accept the designation.

2004–2006: Islamic Courts Union (ICU)

After the defeat of AIAI Aweys played a key role in setting up a system of courts according to the shari'a by local businessmen desperate for order. According to the BBC he was the ICU's spiritual leader. The Courts brought relative stability to areas under its control, after years of turmoil. The Courts' notion of order was strict, including stonings for serious crimes such as rape and murder. At first it only controlled the area of north Mogadishu, but it gained support from many Somali's following the random violence committed by the warlords who controlled southern Mogadishu. Beginning 2004, eleven of these courts folded into an umbrella organization, the Islamic Courts Union, which fielded a formidable militia. A UN report in early 2006 stated that Aweys was receiving military support from Eritrea, as part of the ongoing conflict between it and Ethiopia, though Eritrea denies the claim. Following the ICU's victory in Mogadishu in June 2006, Aweys rose to be the head of the shura committee.

On 19 December 2006, he received medical treatment in Egypt just before the beginning of the war against the UN-backed Transitional Federal Government (TFG) and Ethiopian troops. On 21 December 2006, as the fighting intensified with Ethiopia, he took a flight to an undisclosed location with Yusuf Mohammed Siad Inda'ade, and rather than news of medical treatment, it was said he was on the hajj.

According to Voice of America, Aweys left Mogadishu on 27 December 2006, along with several hundred members of Al-Shabaab's inner circle.

Aweys was the head of the 90-member shura council of the Islamic Courts Union (ICU) of Somalia and according to the BBC was viewed as one of the more radical leaders of the Union, which promoted shari'a and directed the militias that took control of the Somali capital of Mogadishu in June 2006. The BBC also mention that an eight-member executive committee was headed by the more moderate Sharif Sheikh Ahmed. The BBC stated "It is still not clear which man is more powerful." Aweys resigned from the ICU on 28 December 2006, at the end of ICU rule in Mogadishu.

2009–2010: Hizbul Islam

In early 2009, four major rebel groups, Sheikh Aweys' Asmara-based wing of the ARS, Hassan Abdullah Hersi al-Turki's Ras Kamboni Brigade, Jabhatul Islamiya and Muaskar Anole joined to form a new group called Hizbul Islam, to oppose the new government of President Sharif Sheikh Ahmed. Although the group was initially led by Omar Iman Abubakar, he stepped down on 26 May 2009 in favour of Sheikh Aweys taking the position of chairman.

On 23 April 2009, Sheikh Aweys returned to Somalia from Eritrea. He made clear that he would not meet Sheikh Sharif saying:
"Mr Sharif's government was not elected by the Somali people and it is not representing the interests the Somali people"
On 9 May 2009, Hizbul Islam and Al Shabaab tried to topple the government of Sharif Sheikh Ahmed by opening the 2009 Battle of Mogadishu, which lasted for months, in which the Islamists managed to gain territory but failed ultimately to topple the regime. Mogadishu residents reported that they saw foreign fighters in the frontline of the battle, raising concerns that Somalia may become the next terrorist safe haven after Iraq and Afghanistan.

In June 2009, it was rumoured he had been killed during the Battle of Wabho. He later dismissed reports that he was killed or heavily injured.

After the Battle of Kisimayo (2009) the group was involved in an unsuccessful power-struggle with al-Shabaab in which Hizbul Islam was ultimately forced to surrender, after which they merged with al-Shabaab on 20 December 2010 under the banner of al-Shabaab, dropping the name Hizbul Islam.

2010–2013: Al-Shabaab (HSM)

Aweys was involved in the power struggle between Mukhtar Robow (Abu Mansoor) and Moktar Ali Zubeyr (Godane), during which he supported Abu Mansoor in demanding that Godane would step down as the group's Emir. Aweys had been described as Hizbul Islam's political and spiritual leader.

Arrest and detention

In June 2013, Aweys was taken into custody by Somali security forces, denoting the victory of the hardliners in al-Shabab. However, there was speculation in The Economist Newspaper'' the nature of his arrest, initially being promised talks with government officials and then being roughed up by soldiers when arrested instead, created concern that it could have caused the Hawiye clan of the president Hassan Sheikh Mohamud and Aweys to split.

References

External links

 Profile: Somalia's Islamist leader

1935 births
Al-Shabaab (militant group) members
Living people
Hizbul Islam politicians
Leaders of Islamic terror groups
People of the Somali Civil War
People from Dusmareb